The W. A. Catholic Record, later The W. A. Record, later simply The Record, was a newspaper published in Perth, Western Australia from September 1874, and was the official organ of the Archdiocese of Perth. The magazine is now published bi-monthly in both paper and electronic formats.

History
The fourth issue of the newspaper appeared early in 1874.

A bi-monthly "eRecord" electronic magazine is now available free on-line, and a hard copy and PDF version began publication in March 2016.

Archive
Vol.XV No.412 of Thursday 19 July 1888 to New Series No.2061 of Saturday 28 January 1922 have been digitized from photographic copies by the National Library of Australia and may be accessed using Trove.

See also
Other Roman Catholic publications in Australia are:
The Southern Cross (South Australia)
The Advocate (Melbourne)
The Catholic Leader (Brisbane)

References

External links
 

Publications established in 1873
1873 establishments in Australia
Newspapers published in Perth, Western Australia
Catholic newspapers